Steve West (born March 20, 1952) is a Canadian former professional ice hockey forward.  Born in Peterborough, Ontario, West played 142 games in the World Hockey Association with the Michigan Stags, Baltimore Blades, Houston Aeros and Winnipeg Jets.

Personal
His daughter, Sommer West, was a Canadian Olympic softball player at the 2000 Summer Olympics and played for over a decade in the Canadian Women's Hockey League.

References

External links

1952 births
Baltimore Blades players
Canadian ice hockey centres
Greensboro Generals (SHL) players
Houston Aeros (WHA) players
Ice hockey people from Ontario
Living people
Michigan Stags players
Minnesota North Stars draft picks
Oshawa Generals players
Rochester Americans players
Sportspeople from Peterborough, Ontario
Winnipeg Jets (WHA) players